Emil Joseph (Josef) Diemer (15 May 1908, in Radolfzell – 10 October 1990, in Fussbach/Gengenbach) was a German chess master.

Biography
Emil Joseph Diemer was born in 1908 in the German town Radolfzell, in Baden. In 1931, he was out of work and joined the German Nazi party, where he became an active member. He was present at all important international chess events, and became the "chess reporter of the Great German Reich". His articles often appeared in Nazi publications.
In 1942-1943, he played correspondence and tournament games with Klaus Junge.

After the war, he continued his chess journalism, sold chess books, and gave simuls, but the stigma of his Nazi past made it difficult to support himself in this way. As a middle-tier master, his successes in chess were few. In 1953, he was expelled from the German chess federation, whose officials he had accused, in a press campaign, of "homosexuality and corruption of innocent youth".

It was not until 1956, in the Netherlands, that Diemer finally enjoyed real success, winning the Reserves Group of the Hoogovens tournament and later the Open Championship of the Netherlands.

He became less interested in chess, and increasingly interested in Nostradamus, the 16th century French clairvoyant: he claimed to have cracked Nostradamus's secret code, and over 25 years, is said to have mailed over 10,000 letters on the subject. In 1965 he was committed to a psychiatric clinic in Gengenbach. The clinic's director, believing that chess was excessively stressful for Diemer, banned him from playing the game. In 1971, however, this ban was rescinded, and Diemer's membership in the German chess federation was also reinstated. Diemer then played first board as member of a German chess club team. Still lacking financial independence, however, he continued to reside in Gengenbach as a semi-residential patient of the hospital until the end of his life.

Diemer played many unorthodox openings, like the Diemer–Duhm Gambit (1.d4 d5 2.e4 e6 3.c4) and the Alapin–Diemer Gambit (1.d4 e6 2.e4 d5 3.Be3), but is most famous for his refinements to an old idea by Armand Edward Blackmar (1. d4 d5 2. e4 dxe4 3. f3), commonly known as the Blackmar–Diemer Gambit (1. d4 d5 2. e4 dxe4 3. Nc3 Nf6 4. f3).

Diemer died in Gengenbach in 1990 at the age of 82.

Literature
 Georg Studier, Emil Josef Diemer. Ein Leben für das Schach im Spiegel der Zeiten, Manfred Maedler Verlag 1996 (Germany)
 Dany Senechaud, Emil J. Diemer, missionnaire des échecs acrobatiques, Poitiers 1997 (France), 2003 (3rd ed.)

References

External links
 The games of Emil Diemer

1908 births
1990 deaths
People from Radolfzell
Sportspeople from Freiburg (region)
People from the Grand Duchy of Baden
German chess players
Chess theoreticians
20th-century chess players